Blonstein is a surname. Notable people with the surname include:

 Anne Blonstein (1958–2011), British poet and translator
 Marshall Blonstein (born 20th century), American entertainment industry executive

Ashkenazi surnames